Orvosegyetem Sport Club is a Hungarian water polo club from Budapest established in 1957 in the Semmelweis University.

The club's peak was the 1970s. Orvosegyetem won six national championships in a row between 1969 and 1974, and in 1973 it won the European Cup, beating 4-times champion Partizan Belgrade in the final. In 1974 and 1975 also reached the European Cup's final, but lost to MGU Moscow and Partizan respectively. In 1976 it played its fourth European final, losing the Cup Winners' Cup to Mladost Zagreb. In 1978 and 1979 the team culminated its golden era winning its seventh national championship and its second European Cup. The team declined in subsequent years, but it still played in the Hungarian First Championship.

However, with the team moving to XI. district in Budapest, and with the new title sponsor, A-HÍD Zrt. from the 2014-15 season was a very successful one, winning silver medal in both the Hungarian Cup and the Hungarian Championship, whilst also going three rounds in the LEN Champions League qualifiers before falling out against Szolnoki VSC.

Naming history
 Orvosegyetem Sport Club (OSC): (1961 – 1978)
 Medicor-OSC: (1979 – 1985/86)
 OSC: (1986/87 – 1989/90)
 OSC-Boniper (1990/91 – 1991/92)
 OSC: (1992/93 – 1999/00)
 OSC-British Knights: (2000/01 – 2004/05)
 OSC-Kaposvár: (2005/06) - Merged with Kaposvári VK
 OSC-Opus Via: (2006/07 – 2008/09)
 OSC: (2009/10 – 2013/14)
 A-Híd OSC-Újbuda: (2014/15 – 2019/20)
 OSC-Újbuda: (2020/21 – 2021/22)
 Genesys OSC-Újbuda: (2021/22 – ... )

Honours

Domestic competitions 
Országos Bajnokság I (National Championship of Hungary)
 Champions (7): 1969, 1970, 1971, 1972, 1973, 1974, 1978

Magyar Kupa (National Cup of Hungary)
 Winners (2): 1970, 1974

European competitions 
LEN Champions League (Champions Cup)
Winners (2): 1972–73, 1978–79

LEN Cup Winners' Cup
Runners-up (1): 1975–76

LEN Super Cup
Winners (1): 1979

Current squad
Season 2020–21

Staff

 Sporting director: Péter Becsey
 Team Manager: Zoltán Menyhárt
 Youth coach: Attila Petik
 Masseur: Ákos Horváth
 Club doctor: Koppány Kocsis, MD
 Video analyst: Buza Balázs

Transfers (2017-18)
Source: vizipolo.hu

 In:
 Balázs Erdélyi (from Eger)
 Marcell Kolozsi (from Pécsi VSK)
 Sava Ranđelović (from AN Brescia)
 Márton Tóth (from Ferencváros)
 Nemanja Ubović (from AN Brescia)

 Out:
 Bence Bátori (to Szolnoki Dózsa)
 Ádám Nagy (to Miskolci VLC)
 Toni Német (to Ferencváros)
 Slobodan Nikić (to Ferencváros)
 Gergő Zalánki (to Szolnoki Dózsa)

Recent seasons

 Cancelled due to the COVID-19 pandemic.

In European competition
Participations in Champions League (European Cup, Euroleague): 11x
Participations in Euro Cup: 1x
Participations in Cup Winners' Cup: 1x

Notable former players

Olympic champions
András Bodnár – 17 years (1962-1979)  1964 Tokyo 
Ferenc Konrád – 13 years (1966-1979)  1976 Montreal
István Szívós – 12 years (1968-1980)  1976 Montreal
Attila Sudár – 11 years (1972-1981, 1983-1984, 1992-1993)  1976 Montreal
János Konrád – 1 year (1975-1976)  1964 Tokyo
 Slobodan Nikić – 1 year (2016-2017)  2016 Rio de Janeiro
 Sava Ranđelović – 1 year (2017-)  2016 Rio de Janeiro
Bulcsú Székely – junior years  2000 Sydney

References

External links
 

Water polo clubs in Hungary
Sport in Budapest
Sports clubs established in 1957
1957 establishments in Hungary